"Once More with Feeling" is a song written by Kris Kristofferson and Shel Silverstein and originally recorded by Jerry Lee Lewis in 1969 for Smash Records. The song was part of Lewis's studio album She Even Woke Me Up to Say Goodbye and was also released as a single (with "You Went Out of Your Way (to Walk on Me)" on the flip side), reaching number 1 on the Cash Box Country Singles chart and number 2 on the Billboard country chart.

Track listing 

Notes: "From Smash's album She Even Woke Me Up to Say Goodbye SRS-67128"

Charts

References 

1970 songs
1970 singles
Jerry Lee Lewis songs
Smash Records singles
American country music songs